Harry Dickason may refer to:

 Harry Dickason (gymnast) (1890–1962), British gymnast
 Harry Dickason (seaman) (1885–1943), English polar explorer